Antona mutans is a moth of the subfamily Arctiinae first described by Francis Walker in 1854. It is found in the Amazon basin.

References

Lithosiini
Moths described in 1854
Fauna of the Amazon
Moths of South America